The 2020–21 Universidad Nacional season is the 66th season in the football club's history and the 59th consecutive season in the top flight of Mexican football.

Coaching staff

Pre-season and friendlies
Universidad Nacional started their 2020–21 campaign by taking part in the Copa por México, being placed in Group A alongside América, Cruz Azul, and Toluca. The matches were announced in June 2020. UNAM will also play a friendly Clásico Capitalino rivalry match with Club América in Carson, California.

Competitions

Overview

Liga MX

Results by round

Guardianes 2020

Matches

Standings

Liguilla

Quarterfinals

Notes

References 

 
1
Club Universidad Nacional seasons